Moncalieri railway station serves the town and comune of Moncalieri, in the Piedmont region, northwestern Italy.

It started to work on 24 September 1848.

Services

References

Railway stations in the Metropolitan City of Turin
Railway stations opened in 1848

Railway stations in Italy opened in 1848
Moncalieri